Colorado Party (Spanish: Partido Colorado, colored referring to red) can refer to two South American political parties:

 Colorado Party (Paraguay)
 Colorado Party (Uruguay)

See also
 Red Party (disambiguation)